Olivier Edmond (born 29 January 1970) is a French professional golfer.

Edmond was born in Paris. As an amateur, Edmond represented France in the Eisenhower Trophy. He won the 1990 French Amateur Championship and the Brabazon Trophy (tie with Gary Evans). He turned professional later that year. His brother, Pascal is also a professional golfer.

After several seasons on the second tier Challenge Tour, Edmond won a European Tour card at his fifth attempt at qualifying school in 1997. He carried his good form into his début season, and was named the European Tour's Sir Henry Cotton Rookie of the Year in 1998. In 1999, he was successfully treated for testicular cancer but after a moderately successful return to the tour in 2000, including a joint 7th-place finish at the Volvo PGA Championship, wasn't able to return to his previous form and his European Tour career came to an end after the 2003 season.

Having moved to live in Canada, where he became the head professional at Les Quatre Domaines in Mirabel, Quebec, Edmond took just 26 strokes to complete the back nine at Club de Golf Beloeil on his way to setting the course record of 61. In 2006, he finished tied for 2nd in the Canadian PGA Club Professional Championship.

Amateur wins
1990 Brabazon Trophy (tied with Gary Evans), French Amateur Championship

Professional wins (1)

Challenge Tour wins (1)
1997 BPGT Challenge

Team appearances
Amateur
European Boys' Team Championship (representing France): 1988 (winners)
European Amateur Team Championship (representing France): 1989
European Youths' Team Championship (representing France): 1990
St Andrews Trophy (representing the Continent of Europe): 1990
Eisenhower Trophy (representing France): 1990

Professional
Alfred Dunhill Cup (representing France): 1998

References

External links

French male golfers
European Tour golfers
Golfers from Paris
People from Mirabel, Quebec
1970 births
Living people